Gun laws in the Czech Republic in many respects differ from those in other European Union member states (see Gun laws in the European Union). The "right to acquire, keep and bear firearms" is explicitly recognized in the first Article of the Firearms Act. At the constitutional level, the Charter of Fundamental Rights and Freedoms includes the "right to defend own life or life of another person also with arms under conditions stipulated by law".

A gun in the Czech Republic is available to anybody subject to acquiring a firearms license. Gun licenses may be obtained in a way similar to a driving license – by passing a gun proficiency exam, medical examination and having a clean criminal record. Unlike in most other European countries, the Czech gun legislation also permits a citizen to carry a concealed weapon for self-defense – 252,245 out of 308,990 gun license holders have a concealed carry permit (31 December 2021). The most common reason for firearm possession by Czech gun owners is for protection, with hunting and sport shooting being less common.

The beginning of Czech civilian firearms possession dates back to 1421, with the first use of firearms as the primary weapons of Hussite militia (see History of Czech civilian firearms possession). Firearms became indispensable tools for the mostly commoner militia in a war for religious freedom and political independence. Firearms possession became common throughout and after the Hussite wars. The universal right to keep arms for "all people of all standing" was formally affirmed in the 1517 Wenceslaus Agreement. Throughout its 600-year history, Czech firearms legislation remained permissive, with the exception of periods of German Nazi occupation and Communist dictatorship. Today, the ability to be legally armed is considered a symbol of liberty in the country, alongside freedom of speech and free elections. 

The English term pistol originated in 15th-century Czech language. Mariánská skála in Ústí nad Labem is Europe's oldest continually-open shooting range, established in 1617.

History 

History of Czech civilian firearms possession extends over 600 years back, when local militia became the first force whose military strategy and tactics depended on mass use of firearms in battlefield warfare during the 1419 - 1434 Hussite wars. 

In 1419, the Hussite revolt against Catholic church and Sigismund, Holy Roman Emperor started. The ensuing Hussite wars over religious freedom and political independence represented a clash between professional Crusader armies from all around Europe, relying mostly on standard medieval tactics and cold weapons, and primarily commoners' militia-based Czech forces which relied on use of firearms. First serving as auxiliary weapons, firearms gradually became indispensable for the Hussite armies.

1421 marks a symbolical beginning of the Czech civilian firearms possession due to two developments: enactment of formal duty of all inhabitants to obey call to arms by provisional elected Government in order to defend the country and first battle in which Hussite Taborite militia employed firearms as the main weapons of attack.

Universal right to keep arms was affirmed in 1517 Wenceslaus Agreement. In 1524 the Enactment on Firearms was passed, establishing rules and permits for carrying of firearms. Firearms legislation remained permissive until the 1939-1945 German occupation. The 1948-1989 period of Communist dictatorship marked another period of severe gun restrictions.

Permissive firearms legislation returned in 1990s after the fall of Communist dictatorship. Today, the "right to acquire, keep and bear arm" is explicitly recognized in the first Article of the Firearms Act. On constitutional level, the Charter of Fundamental Rights and Freedoms includes the "right to defend own life or life of another person also with arms".

Article 6(4) of the Charter of Fundamental Rights and Freedoms 

Czech Constitutional Charter of Fundamental Rights and Freedoms Article 6(4) states that "the right to defend own life or life of another person also with arms is guaranteed under conditions set out in the law." 

Media dubbed the provision "Czech Republic's second amendment" both in connection with the protection of the right to keep and bear arms in the US constitution and due to the fact that before approval of this provision, the Czech Charter of Fundamental Rights and Freedoms had only been amended once since adoption in 1992.

According to the Czech gun laws expert and attorney Tomáš Gawron the provision bears no resemblance to the American second amendment. Unlike its US counterpart, the Czech provision doesn't stipulate a restraint on Government's power, but only symbolically sets out significance of the mentioned right and otherwise leaves the Government a free hand in setting detailed conditions in law. By being mostly symbolic, the provision is more similar to the Article 10 of Mexican constitution. Also while the American second amendment centers on the right to keep and bear arms, the Czech provision deals primarily with right of personal defense, including with arms.

2002 Firearms Act 

Cornerstones of current Czech gun law remain the same since the 1990s: precisely defined requirements that an applicant must meet in order to be granted a license. Once a person obtains the necessary license, the law is relatively permissive as regards both the type of firearms that become legally accessible, as well as possibility of their concealed carry for personal protection. At the same time, the issuing authority (police) firearm owners' database is connected to information needed for a background check and red flags any incidents that may lead to loss of license requirements. Similarly, health clearance by the general practitioner is needed for periodical renewal of license (every ten years).

Under Act No. 119/2002 Coll. every citizen that meets the act's conditions has the right to have firearms license issued and can then obtain a firearm. Holders of D (exercise of profession) and E (self-defense) licenses, which are also shall-issue, can carry up to two concealed firearms for protection.

Types of licenses 
There are five types of gun license; however, these should not be mistaken with the categories for guns:
 A – Firearm collection
 B – Sport shooting
 C – Hunting
 D – Exercise of a profession
 E – Self-defense

Obtaining a license
An applicant applies for a gun license at a designated local office of the National police. If the conditions of age, qualification, health clearance, criminal integrity and personal reliability are met and a fee of 700 CZK (US$ ) per type is paid, the license shall be issued in thirty days. The license must be renewed every ten years (no need to undergo qualification exam if the application is filed at least two months before termination of the previous license; health clearance still necessary).

Age
To obtain a B or C type license, the applicant must be at least 18 years old. Under special circumstances, the applicant need only be 15 if a member of a sporting club, or 16 if taught hunting in schools with such a curriculum. To obtain an A, D or E type license, the applicant must be 21.

Qualification

Obtaining the license requires passing a theoretical and practical exam.
 Theoretical exam: The theoretical exam consists of a written test of 30 multiple choice questions (Created and distributed by the Ministry of the Interior) with a maximum of 79 points possible. To pass the written exam, 67 points are needed for type A, 71 for type B or C, and 74 for type D or E. The test deals with the following issues:
knowledge of firearms legislation,
knowledge of legislation related to legitimate use of firearm (e.g. self-defense),
general knowledge of firearms and ammunition, and
first aid.
 Practical exam
Safe handling: this comprises
inspecting, whether the firearm is loaded (safely unloading),
field stripping as needed for clean-up,
preparation of firearm and ammunition for shooting, shooting, procedure of handling the firearm in case of malfunction, conclusion of shooting.
Touching the trigger, pointing in an other-than-safe direction or trying to field-strip a loaded gun (dummy round is used) results in the applicant failing the exam. Depending on the types of licenses sought, applicants may be asked to show their ability safely to manipulate multiple firearms (typically CZ 75 and/or CZ 82 pistol, bolt-action CZ 452 rifle and a double-barreled shotgun).
A shooting test, which requires specific scores dependent on the type of license applied for:
For the B type license it is 25m on rifle target (A4 sheet sized) with 4 out of 5 rounds hitting the target sheet shooting from a rifle (2 out of five for A type). .22 Long Rifle chambered rifle is used. Alternatively, an applicant can shoot a pistol on 50/20 pistol target at 10 m.
For the C type license, the applicant must fire at 25m with a rifle (same as cat. B) and also successfully hit the rifle target from the distance of 25m shooting from a shotgun (Usually double-barreled), 3 out of 4 rounds must hit the target (at least partially).
For the E type license, the applicant must successfully hit the international pistol target 50/20 (50 cm x 50 cm) from a distance of 10m (15m for D type license) shooting from a pistol, 4 out of 5 rounds must hit the sheet (2 out of 5 for A type).
 In each of the cases above, the actual score is irrelevant; the projectiles simply have to hit the target sheet within the circles. Also in each case, the applicant is allowed 3 test shots to familiarise himself with the particular firearm used for the test. The shotgun is an exception to this, where only one round is allowed as a test shot.

A person can obtain any combination of the types at once, but must make his selections known before the exam and the highest score needs to be met. Typically, people obtain E and B type because these two types provide the best versatility (almost any firearm can be owned and carried concealed). The D type is required by law for members of the municipal police (members of the state police do not need a license for on-duty firearms) and does not itself permit private gun ownership (unless the person obtains at least one additional license type).

Health clearance
Applicant (license holder) must be cleared by his general practitioner as being fit to possess, carry and use a firearm. The health check includes probes into the applicant's anamnesis (i.e. medical history) and a complete physical screening (including eyesight, hearing, balance). The doctor may request examination by a specialist in case he deems it necessary to exclude illnesses or handicaps stated in the respective governmental regulation. Specialist medical examination is obligatory in case of illnesses and handicaps that restrict the ability to drive a car.

Governmental Regulation No. 493/2002 Coll. divides the listed illnesses and handicaps into four groups, covering various issues from psychological and psychiatrical to eyesight and hearing (for example, the applicant must be able to hear casual speech over distance of 6 meters to be cleared for the E type). Generally, the regulation is more permissive when it comes to the license type A and B, and more strict with view to the other types, listing which illnesses and handicaps may curtail or outright prevent positive clearance by the general practitioner. The outcome of the medical examination may be either full clearance, denial, or conditional clearance that lists obligatory health accessories (glasses, hearing aid, etc.) or sets obligatory escort when armed (e.g. B – sport shooters with minor psychological issues, or with addiction habits cured more than three years prior to the health check).

Criminal integrity
The enactment specifies the amount of time that must elapse after a person is released from prison for serving time for particular groups of crimes. Ex-convicts punished for committing selected crimes, such as public endangerment, or participation in organized crime group or murder, if sentenced to more than 12 years imprisonment, may never fulfill this condition. There is a central registry of criminal offenses in the Czech Republic. The criminal integrity is reviewed notwithstanding any possible expungement of the records for other purposes.
 After being conditionally discharged, the criminal integrity is regained after the probation period ends or in 3 years in special cases
 After serving less than 2 years or being sentenced to different kind of punishment than imprisonment, the criminal integrity is regained after 5 years
 After being sentenced for 2 to 5 years, the criminal integrity is regained after 10 years
 After being sentenced for 5 to 12 years, the criminal integrity is regained after 20 years
 After being sentenced for more than 12 years (for defined crimes, such as murder, treason, etc.) the criminal integrity is never regained.

Conditional discharge does not count, only the original sentence.

Police may order temporary seizure of firearm license and firearms in case that the holder is charged with any intentional crime, or a negligent crime connected with breach of duties relating to possession, carrying or use of firearms or ammunition.

Personal reliability
A person who verifiably excessively drinks alcohol or uses illegal drugs, as well who was repeatedly found guilty of specified misdemeanors (e.g. related to firearms, DUI, public order, etc.)  in the preceding three years, is considered unreliable for the purposes of issuing a gun license. The police has the right to inquire information regarding these issues also from municipal authorities (misdemeanors are dealt with by municipal authorities and there is no central registry related to them).

Losing reliability is caused by:
 Committing a crime and being conditionally discharged, until the probation period ends.
 Excessive use of alcohol or addictive substances
 Committing multiple misdemeanors from specific segments of the law (Regarding Firearms, Explosives, Driving under influence, Czech Republic defense, public order, property and illegal hunting/fishing). Only one transgression in the last 3 years is tolerated. Other types of misdemeanors do not count to personal reliability criteria.

Police may order temporary seizure of firearm license and firearms in case that administrative proceedings against the holder are initiated for committing selected misdemeanors (e.g. carrying while intoxicated, refusing to undergo intoxication test while armed, shooting outside licensed range unless in self-defense).

Obtaining of a license by a foreigner
The law distinguishes foreigners according to their country of origin. For selected foreigners, a license is shall-issue as same as for Czech citizens, while for others it is a may-issue.
 Shall-issue
 foreigners from countries of the EU, European Economic Area and Switzerland (in case of their being granted temporary or permanent residency, then also their family members)
 foreigners from NATO countries
 foreigners having been granted permanent residency in the Czech Republic and long-term EU residency or long-term residency in other state of EU and longterm residency in the Czech Republic (and their family members, if having been granted long-term residency)
 persons having been granted international asylum in the Czech Republic
 May-issue
 other foreigners (no appeal possible against decision of appropriate police department to deny permit)

Foreign born residents are treated equally in the eye of Czech law (see above), but proof of a lack of criminal record in their country of origin must be provided; persons having residence also in another EU country must provide documentation showing that they are allowed to own a firearm therein. All the documents with the exception of the documents in Slovak must be translated into Czech by a sworn translator.

Foreigners with registered place of residence in the Czech Republic may purchase firearms after obtaining corresponding licenses and permits; persons having residence in another EU country must provide documentation showing that they are allowed to own such a firearm therein in order to be granted a permit to purchase a B category gun.

The written test as well as the practical exam has to be taken in Czech. Until 31 December 2011, test-takers were allowed to use a sworn interpreter/translator, but this has since been forbidden.

Categorization

Categories of guns 
Under the current gun law, guns, ammunition and some accessories are divided into four categories (these should not be mistaken with types of licenses):

A person must obtain the Gun License (Zbrojní průkaz) to be allowed to own gun of categories A, A-I, B and C. To own a gun in the D category only the age of 18 is required. A, A-I, B, C and C-I category weapon has to be registered within 10 working day with the police after it is bought.

Other

Obtaining firearms 

A, A-I, B and C category of firearms may be acquired and possessed only by gun license holders and their transfer must be registered with police within 10 days. A-category firearms may be acquired only for collecting purposes and are subject to may-issue exemption. Each of A-I and B category firearm is subject to shall-issue permitting process. C category firearms can be purchased by any gun license holder. 

C-I category of firearms may be acquired and possessed by a person older than 18, with full legal capacity, place of residence in the Czech Republic, without conviction for selected felonies, full mental capacity. Transfer must be registered with police within 10 days.

D category fiearms are available to anyone older than 18 and are not subject to registration.

There is no limit in the law on the number of owned guns. The law specifies safe storage requirements for those owning more than two weapons or more than 500 rounds of ammunition. Additional safe storage requirements are stipulated for those owning more than 10 and more than 20 firearms.

Possession of a firearm that does not belong to category D or C-I without a gun license (as well as sale, manufacturing, procurement, etc.) is a criminal offense which carries a penalty of up to two years imprisonment (up to eight years in defined cases).

Using firearms and shooting ranges 
Shooting is permitted only within licensed shooting ranges or when allowed by special laws, e.g. hunting or self-defense.

Shooting of blank rounds or signal weapons is also permitted in case that it does not threaten life, health and public order.

There are about two hundred places opened for the public. Any adult can visit such a range and shoot from available weapons. A person without a gun license has to be supervised (if younger than 18, then by a person at least 21 years old who has been a holder of a gun license for at least 3 years).

Rules on open and concealed carry

Rules on carrying of firearms underwent general overhaul on 30 January 2021, allowing more flexibility for open carry of firearms during special events when open carry is considered customary, e.g. military re-enactment (including movement of units in historical uniforms between reenactment locations) and sports (e.g. biathlon).

 Permitless carry
 Concealed carry: Firearms of D and C-I category (e.g. black powder derringer or gas pistol) must be carried in concealed manner. 
 Open carry: Similar rules as in case of gun license holders below.
 A, B, C type gun license holders:
 General rule: Firearms must be transported unloaded and in closed container.
 Open carry in publicly accessibly areas is possible in case that all of the following conditions are met:
 firearm is unloaded, and
 it is done within context of conducting activity that includes shooting or similar handling of firearms and ammunition, the rules of which permit gun license holder to open carry of a firearm, and
 it is permitted as regards the chosen means of transport; when using public transport, a firearm must always be within a closed container, and
 it may be considered appropriate under local conditions and within given activity, and
 it does not disturb public order.
 Open carry of loaded long firearm is also possible within hunting areas.
 D, E type gun license holders:
 Concealed carry: Up to two firearms (loaded, with a round chambered).
 Open carry within privately owned premises: The Firearms Act defines having a firearm within "residential or commercial premises or within clearly demarcated real estate with the consent of the owner or tenant of said premises or real estate" as possession, not carrying within the legal meaning of the term. As such, owners or tenants of clearly demarcated privately owned, publicly accessible properties may allow factual open carry within their premises.
 D type gun license holders working for Municipal Police or Czech National Bank while on duty:
 Open carry: Up to two firearms (loaded, with a round chambered).

It is prohibited to carry or transport a firearm with silencer installed.

Carrying firearm while intoxicated is illegal and can lead to heavy fines and loss of the gun license. Police often conduct intoxication tests of open-carrying hunters. 

The law does not include any "gun-free zones" provisions, apart from general prohibition of firearm carry during protests and demonstrations. Public authorities that enact and practically enforce ban on firearm carrying within their premises are legally bound to provide option for storing a short firearm upon entry (either in a safe compliant with the Firearms Act or with a police officer).

The Czech Republic is a relatively safe country: Prague, with the highest crime rate in the country, still ranks as one of the safest capitals in the European Union. Considering the number of E type licenses issued, there are about 240,000 people who could potentially carry a firearm; however, it is not clear how many regularly do so.

Ammunition and magazine restrictions 

Ammunition may be purchased only by a gun license holder. Owners of historical firearms (D - category) can also purchase ammunition suitable for their firearm without a gun license.

High-penetrating (armor-piercing) ammunition is classified as category A. 

Hollow point bullets for use in short firearms are classified in A-I category and available subject to shall-issue exemption permit. For use in long firearms, hollow point bullets are treated the same as other types of ammunition. 

There are no restrictions on caliber type, however firearms with caliber larger than 20mm (apart from signal weapons) are classified as category A. Special safe storage requirements apply for those having more than 500, 10,000 and 20,000 cartridges.

A January 2021 amendment of the Firearms Act necessitated by the EU Gun Ban introduced "over-the-limit" magazines, i.e. those holding more than 10/20 rounds for use in long/short firearms. These may be used in a B category firearm subject to shall issue exemption permit; previous owners were grandfathered.

Armament licences 
Gun licences equivalent for conducting business with firearms. Divided into 11 types.
 A – Development or manufacturing of firearms/ammunition
 B – Repairs, modifications or deactivation of firearms/ammunition
 C – Firearms/ammunition buying and selling
 D – Lending and safekeeping of firearms/ammunition
 E – Deactivation or destruction of weapons/ammunition
 F – Training in handling and using firearms/ammunition
 G – Providing security for persons/property.
 H – Cultural, sports and hobby shooting activities.
 I – Collecting and displaying firearms/ammunition
 J – Securing tasks defined by special legal enactments.
 K – Pyrotechnical Survey (replaced F type gun licence in 2017)

Self defense with firearms 

There are three main concepts in Czech law which exclude criminal & civil liability based on self-defense. "Utmost necessity" (krajní nouze) may be invoked against a danger other than an attack by another person, such as a raging dog. "Necessary self defense" (nutná obrana) may be invoked against attack by another person, be it a direct assault or a dog ordered to attack. The third concept is called "justified use of a gun" (oprávněné užití zbraně) and generally may not be invoked by civilians, but rather by police or other officers.

Czech law does not include specific provisions regarding self-defense with use of a weapon. Same rules apply in case of unarmed defense or defense with any type of weapon. The Ministry of the Interior officially recommends carrying non-lethal weapons such as pepper sprays, paralyzers, or gas pistols as means of self-defense. To keep and bear arms for personal protection, Czech citizens must first obtain a shall-issue license.

A number of successful defensive uses of firearms or other weapon is being cleared as legitimate self-defense by authorities every year without raising wider public concern, including for example a 2014 shooting of an attacker by a bartender in Hořovice, or a 2014 shooting of an aggressive burglar in a garage by homeowner in Čimice. However, some cases become rather notable, see Self-defence (Czech Republic)#Defensive gun use cases.

Popularity of guns

Given that firearms possession was banned during German Nazi occupation and then allowed only to those deemed loyal during the Communist regime, the right to be armed is seen as one of attributes of liberty in the country . A rapid rise of criminality involving illegal firearms following the Velvet Revolution led to an associated fast rise in legal firearms ownership in the country in the 1990s. By 2001, some 3% of the population possessed firearms licenses. The number of license holders fell slightly from this point (faster as regards C licenses, while E licenses remained mostly level) until the 2015 EU Gun Ban Proposal, from which point the number of license holders began to rise again (mostly E licenses). The police recorded a tripling of average monthly applications for firearms licenses by the end of 2015 compared to the beginning of that year.

While the number of license holders started to rise gradually, firearm sales rose even faster in 2015, mostly prompted by the EU efforts to restrict law abiding citizens' access to firearms. Average annual rise in the number of registered firearms amounted to 14,500 guns between 2006 and 2014, there were 54,508 new registered firearms in 2015 alone. Local tendencies generally follow the nationwide trend, however any worsening of security in any given district is often followed by a sharp rise in gun ownership therein. For example, in 2011, after a wave of racially motivated  against majority population victims, there was a rise of gun ownership in Šluknov Hook area. 

250,342 out of 307,372 (2020) gun owners have self-defense licenses, which permit them to carry concealed firearms for protection (any B or C category firearm, not only pistols). Following a wave of terror attacks around Europe, a number of politicians as well as security professionals started urging gun owners to actually carry firearms in order to be able to contribute to soft targets protection. These included, among many others, the President Miloš Zeman, whose own wife obtained E license and a revolver, as well as Libor Lochman, Chief of URNA, the country's main special forces anti-terrorism unit. While there are no statistics as regards how many E license holder actually do carry firearms in general, there are places known for high concealed carry rate, such as Prague Jewish Quarter.

Unlike elsewhere in Europe, there is a relatively high proportion of semi-automatic firearms in the country, which are generally considered better suited for self-defense. The most owned firearms in the country are CZ 75 Compact and Glock 17. Other popular guns include 1911 clones and semi-automatic rifles made by Czech manufacturers, especially vz. 58 and AR-15 (of which there are ). There are relatively fewer revolvers, mostly from US manufacturers such as Smith & Wesson and Colt, or Czech producers ALFA and Kora.

Incidents and gun crimes 

It is generally not common for licensed gun owners to commit violent crimes with their guns, and most of the gun crimes are committed with illegal weapons that are beyond the control of the law. Annually, police investigate about 500 cases of illegal arming (with or without direct connection to committing other crime).

Police recorded 45 violent crimes (most of them, 17, being "dangerous threats" and 6 homicides - including attempts, mostly intra-family) being committed with legal firearms (A,B,C category) in 2016, down from 71 in 2014 and 51 in 2015 respectively. Meanwhile, illegally possessed firearms (A,B,C category) were used in 71 violent crimes (9 murders) in 2016. When resorting to use of firearms, perpetrators mostly utilize non-lethal free-to-buy D category weapons (see above) that resemble real guns, with 906 such crimes taking place in 2016. Apart from simple threats, the most common crime committed with firearms is robbery. Out of 1.500 robberies recorded in 2016, 153 took place with use of D category free-to-buy non-lethal weapons, 24 with illegally possessed firearms and 3 with legally possessed firearms (out of over 900,000 legally owned firearms).

It is important to note that Czech police records completed and attempted homicides in the same category. The total number of people shot dead (homicides, police action, self defense), without distinction of legal or illegal source of gun, is recorded by CZSO. CZSO recorded 7 gun related assault deaths in 2016, 9 in 2017 and 5 in 2018.

In 2018, police recorded three homicides with legally held firearms including attempts of which one was subsequently ruled self defense and the other was ruled manslaughter with only a probation sentence, leaving a single criminal murder.

Overall, legally held firearms are implicated in about 3.5% of murders including attempts while 7% of the adult male population owns one (adult males are responsible for about 90% of murders in the Czech Republic).

Occasionally, crimes with legally owned guns do happen. The most notable examples include:
 2001 shooting of three policemen who were called by a woman claiming she was being attacked by her husband. On the scene, the policemen were negotiating with the husband who was threatening to commit suicide with his legally owned .38 revolver. When the situation seemed about to be peacefully solved, the hysteric wife ran into the room. The husband thereafter shot three policemen (two mortally) and committed suicide.
 2005 "Forest Killer", who was planning to go on a killing spree in Prague Metro. As part of his preparation, the former policeman randomly murdered two hikers in a forest and another person four days later in another forest about 200 km from the first killing with his legally owned Glock. Police captured Kalivoda a week later, thus preventing further murders. Kalivoda was sentenced to life imprisonment. While in prison, he committed suicide in 2010. Being a former policeman, Kalivoda had passed a difficult psychological evaluation as part of the police selection procedure.
 2013 Raškovice shooting, where a 31-year-old schoolteacher invaded house of one of his students, aged 17, with whom he had allegedly been previously intimately involved, and shot the student and her grandparents, using various legally owned firearms (with caliber .22, .38 and .45). The perpetrator had passed psychological evaluation ordered by his general practitioner before getting gun license. He was sentenced to 27 years imprisonment.
 2015 Uherský Brod shooting, the second mass murder committed with a firearm in the country's peacetime history, in which a deranged individual murdered 8 people (same death toll as Olga Hepnarová's 1973 vehicular murder). He was a holder of a gun license and legally owned both of the guns he used in the shooting. Previously, he and his wife committed misdemeanors against public order, which would have allowed police to revoke his license. The first mass murder with use of a firearm in modern (post 1993) Czech history happened in 2009 in Petřvald with four victims and the third happened in 2019 in Ostrava with seven people shot dead; both were committed with illegally held handguns.

General attitudes to guns

Many businessmen felt the need to obtain a firearm because the times shortly after the Velvet Revolution are known for the rise in organized crime often related to the economic transformation in the early 1990s.

Due to falling crime rates, fewer people felt the need to carry a firearm for protection after 2000. This trend however changed in 2015 following the European migrant crisis and November 2015 Paris attacks. Gun advocacy groups argue that there is no point in banning guns because criminals will get guns no matter how tight the law is. At the same time, however, the rules are deemed to be restrictive enough to prevent criminals from easily obtaining firearms, while allowing upstanding citizens to own them for personal protection. For example, in 2010, Norwegian terrorist Anders Breivik, incited by a BBC documentary which described Prague as "being the most important transit site point for illicit weapons in Europe", found himself unable to illegally obtain any in the country when preparing for the 2011 Norway attacks. That Czech Republic has a strong tradition in firearms manufacturing and competition shooting contributes to generally moderate attitude to gun control.

About a fifth of members of the Czech Parliament are holders of gun license; some of them are believed to conceal carry also within the parliament grounds (parliamentarians are not required to pass gun check on entry unlike other staff or visitors).

Other types of weapons
There is currently no regulation on other type of weapons such as knives, pepper sprays, batons or electrical paralyzers. These items can be freely bought and carried.  Similarly as in the case of firearms, it is prohibited to carry these weapons to court buildings, demonstrations and mass meetings. The Ministry of the Interior officially recommends carrying non-lethal weapons such as pepper sprays, paralyzers, or gas pistols as means of self-defense

The Czech penal code defines "weapon" as "anything that may make an attack against the person more severe". Although there are no restrictions on possession and carrying of weapons, their use in commission of a crime is punishable by stiffer sentences. For example, blackmail carries six months to four years imprisonment, but blackmail with a weapon carries four to eight years imprisonment.

References and sources 

Czech Republic
Law
Czech Republic
Law enforcement in the Czech Republic